Geraldo Junio do Amaral (born 30 June 1987) more commonly known as Cabo Junio Amaral is a Brazilian military figure and politician. He has spent his political career representing his home state of Minas Gerais, having served as state representative since 2015.

Personal life
Amaral is a corporal in the Brazilian military police. Amaral is married.

Political career
Amaral was the most voted candidate for the chamber of deputies in the state of Minas Gerais, receiving 158.541 votes or 1.57% of all the valid ballots. Since being elected Amaral has served as the vice-president of the PSL and its coalition members in the lower house of the Brazilian parliament.

He is a close ideological and political ally to Jair and Eduardo Bolsonaro.

References

1987 births
Living people
Brazilian military personnel
Social Liberal Party (Brazil) politicians
Members of the Chamber of Deputies (Brazil) from Minas Gerais
People from Belo Horizonte